The 1982 NCAA Skiing Championships were contested at the Whiteface Ski Resort in Lake Placid, New York as part of the 29th annual NCAA-sanctioned ski tournament to determine the individual and team national champions of men's collegiate slalom skiing and cross-country skiing in the United States.

Colorado, coached by Tim Hinderman, claimed their eleventh team national championship, 24.5 points ahead of Vermont in the cumulative team standings.

Venue

This year's NCAA skiing championships were hosted at the Whiteface Ski Resort in Lake Placid, New York.

These were the second championships held in the state of New York (1980).

Team scoring

See also
List of NCAA skiing programs

References

1982 in New York (state)
NCAA Skiing Championships
NCAA Skiing Championships
1982 in alpine skiing
1982 in cross-country skiing